John Bell  is Emeritus Professor of Law (1973) at the University of Cambridge and a Fellow of Pembroke College, Cambridge. He served as General Editor of the Cambridge Law Journal from 2010 to 2019.

Prior to appointment to the Cambridge Chair in 2001, he was professor of law at the University of Leeds (1989–2001) and fellow and tutor in law at Wadham College, Oxford (1979–1989).

He is an honorary member of Hardwicke Chambers, and was ordained as a permanent deacon within the Catholic Church in July 2012.

Academic interests
Bell's academic interests include comparative law, jurisprudence, public law, and European Law.

Publications

References

Fellows of the British Academy
Fellows of Pembroke College, Cambridge
Fellows of Wadham College, Oxford
Academics of the University of Leeds
Living people
Year of birth missing (living people)
British legal scholars
Honorary King's Counsel
Legal scholars of the University of Oxford
Professors of Law (Cambridge, 1973)